Olden may refer to:

Places
Olden, Norway, a village in Stryn, Sogn og Fjordane county, Norway
Olden, Missouri, an unincorporated community
Olden, Texas, a community in Eastland county, Texas, USA

People
Charles Smith Olden, an American politician
Georg Olden (actor), an American child/teen actor
Georg Olden (graphic designer), an American designer
Paul Olden, an announcer at Yankee stadium
Rudolf Olden, a German journalist
Sondre Olden, a Norwegian hockey player

Entertainment
 Olden (album), a 2004 album by alternative roots rock band 16 Horsepower